Masuda, Funai, Eifert & Mitchell, Ltd.  is a U.S. law firm headquartered in Chicago, Illinois, with additional offices in suburban Chicago and Los Angeles, California.

History
Masuda Funai was founded in 1929 by Thomas Masuda. Masuda was a general practitioner, with significant ties to the Japanese community and government of Japan, having been honored with Order of the Sacred Treasure Fourth Class in 1981, currently known as "The Order of the Sacred Treasure, Gold Rays with Rosette", by the country of Japan. Masaru Funai concentrated his practice on advising foreign enterprises entering the U.S. market on all phases of business commencement and he was also honored with The Fourth Class of the Order of the Sacred Treasure by the Japanese government in 2001. The firm’s other namesakes, Helmut Eifert and James Mitchell, joined the firm in the 1960s.

The firm consisted of 13 attorneys and one office in 1981 and has grown steadily into a national law practice with three offices and more than 40 attorneys. Masuda Funai has a broad range of practice areas, including corporate, finance and acquisitions, commercial and trade, employment, labor and benefits, immigration, litigation and real estate practices.

Practice Areas

Notable Attorneys and Alumni
Dayne O. Kono – member of the 2010 Japanese American Leadership Delegation 
Kathleen M. Gaber – former attorney for the Department of Justice, Immigration and Naturalization Service (INS)
Lawrence Flood – current associate judge for the Circuit Court of Cook County, Chicago, Illinois

Professional Affiliations

Alliott Group
Masuda Funai became a member of the Alliott Group in 2012. Alliott Group is an international law firm network.

References

External links
Official Website

Law firms based in Chicago
Law firms established in 1929
1929 establishments in Illinois